Massama Asselmo (born 1 June 1990) is a Chadian football player and a member of the Chad national football team.

Club career 

He played club football in Foullah Edifice in Chad where he won national championship in 2011, and Coupe de Ligue de N'Djaména in 2010. He wore number 15, and captained the team. In 2012, he was transferred to US Bitam, in Gabon. In 2015 he moved to O'Mbila Nziami, and in 2017 to Colombe Sportive Sangmélima in Cameroon. In the season 2017/18 he played for Ethiopian club Wolaitta Dicha.

International career 

Asselmo played in 2012 Africa Cup of Nations qualification matches against Togo home and away, Botswana home and away, Tunisia home and away, Malawi away. In a match against Botswana on 26 March 2011 he was the captain of the team. So far, he has 13 FIFA official and 5 unofficial caps and 1 unofficial goal for Chad.

See also
 List of Chad international footballers

References

1990 births
Living people
People from Mayo-Kebbi Est Region
Chadian footballers
Chad international footballers
Foullah Edifice FC players
US Bitam players
USM Libreville players
Association football defenders
Chadian expatriate footballers
Expatriate footballers in Gabon
Chadian expatriate sportspeople in Gabon
Expatriate footballers in Cameroon
Chadian expatriate sportspeople in Cameroon
Expatriate footballers in Ethiopia